is a Prefectural Natural Park in northern Hyōgo Prefecture, Japan. Established in 1959, the park spans the municipalities of Kami, Shin'onsen, Toyooka, and Yabu. The designation of the park protects the habitat of the Japanese giant salamander (Special Natural Monument), Japanese macaque, and tanuki.

See also
 National Parks of Japan
 Hyōnosen-Ushiroyama-Nagisan Quasi-National Park

References

External links
  Map of Tajima Sangaku Prefectural Natural Park

Parks and gardens in Hyōgo Prefecture
Protected areas established in 1959
1959 establishments in Japan